Fereydoon (from Middle Persian Frēdōn, Proto-Iranian Θraitauna-) is an Iranian mythical character.

(Also see the disambiguation page for Freydun and Fereydun.)

Fereydoon, Fereydoun or Ferydoon (Persian: فریدون) may refer to:

People:
Fereydoon Batmanghelidj (1931–2004), an Iranian medical doctor best known for his book, Your Body's Many Cries for Water
Fereydoon Davatchi, the director of Rheumatology Research Center (RRC) in Tehran University of Medical sciences
Fereydoon Family (born 1945), leading Persian physicist in the field of nanotechnology and solid-state physics
Fereydoon Farrokhzad (1936–1992), Persian singer, actor, poet, TV and Radio host, writer, and political opposition figure
Fereydoon Fazli, (born 1971), Iranian football player
Hassan Feridon (born 1948), birth name of Hassan Rouhani, 7th President of Iran
Fereydoon Hoveyda (1924–2006), influential Iranian diplomat, writer and thinker
Fereydoon Mirza (1810–1855), the 5th son of Abbas Mirza, then crown prince of Persia
Fereydoon Moshiri (1926–2000), contemporary Persian poet
Fereydoon Motamed (1917–1993), internationally known professor and linguist
Ferydoon Zandi (born 1979), Iranian football midfielder

Places:
Fereydoon Kenar, Iranian resort town on the Caspian Sea
Fereydoon Shahr, the center of Fereydunshahr County is a city in the western part of the Isfahan province of Iran

See also
Fereydun
Fereydun (given name)
Fereydun (disambiguation)